Mademoiselle La Grange (1639–1727), was a French stage actor.

She was a pioneer member of both the Molière's company (from 1672), and of the Comédie-Française. She belonged to the first Sociétaires of the Comédie-Française (see Troupe of the Comédie-Française in 1680). She retired in 1692.

References 

1639 births
1727 deaths
17th-century French actresses
French stage actresses